The Stanserhorn is a mountain in Switzerland, located in the canton of Nidwalden near to the border with Obwalden, with the peak at  above sea level.

It is a popular tourist destination, which can be reached from the adjacent town of Stans by a funicular railway and cable car, or via walking routes from Stans or Dallenwil.

History

The first public transport route to the peak was started in 1891 and completed in 1893, a three section funicular railway.  The builders were the business partners
Franz Josef Bucher-Durrer and Josef Durrer-Gasser.

The first section started from Stans town, through the low pastures above the town and over three level crossings, to an intermediate station at Kälti (also sometimes spelt Chälti). The second section continued through forest to another intermediate station at Bluematt (also sometimes spelt Blumatt), then the third section crossed the high pastures and the exposed slope leading up to the summit station and hotel. Each section was electrically powered (making it one of the world's first electrically powered mountain railways), with the complete trip to the summit taking 45minutes.

The railway ran a tourist service until 1970, when on the night of the 2/3October the funicular cable was struck by lightning.  This started a fire which destroyed the summit hotel and the driving engine for the third section in its basement.
As a result of this, and also the imminent expiry of the concession, the second funicular section stopped operating in 1974.  Part of the driving engine of this section can be seen today outside the summit buildings, while parts of two cars can still be seen at the former Bluematt station.

A new cable car
was built to replace the two upper funicular sections, which started operation in May1975. The first funicular section continued in operation, as it does to this day.

In 2001 a revolving restaurant was built at the summit station, and in 2003 an outside observation deck was added.

In 2010 construction work started on a new cable car to replace the 1975 installation.  This was to be a new design, the world's first
"CabriO" double deck open top cable car, built by Garaventa.  Carrying 60 passengers per cabin with room for 30 on the open deck, passengers are able to observe the mountain scenery as well as the cable and engineering installations during the six-minute journey.  While this new cable car was being built, the first funicular section and its original wooden cars were renovated.  The final run of the former cable car was on 23 October 2011;
the renovated funicular and new "CabriO" were opened on 29 June 2012.

Visiting

The funicular railway and cable car normally run daily from mid-April to mid-November.

The journey to the top starts in Stans town at the original 1893 bottom station (elevation), close to Stans railway station on the Luzern-Engelberg line.  The journey, on the original wooden funicular wagons, takes 9minutes to the Kälti intermediate station (altitude).  From here the "CabriO" cable car takes 6minutes to the summit station (altitude).  The cable car closely follows the route of the original second and third stage funiculars, and the remains of the track and the Bluematt station can still be seen.

The summit buildings include a self-service restaurant, three meeting/dining rooms, a souvenir shop, and a sun terrace and observation deck.

From the summit buildings, a round trip walk is available around the summit (30minutes), or to the peak at altitude.  From the peak, on a clear day, as well as the mountains around there are views as far as Alsace and the Black Forest in Germany.  Ten lakes in total are visible: the Zugersee, Wichelsee, Vierwaldstättersee, Sempachersee, Sarnersee, Hallwilersee, Gerzensee, Bannalpsee, Baldeggersee and Alpnachersee.

A variety of hiking trail routes are available down to Bluematt-Kälti-Stans, Ahornhütte-Büren, Wiesenberg-Dallenwil, or Wirzweli-Wolfenschiessen.  The routes to/from the summit are closed in winter or in bad weather.

Gallery

See also
List of mountains of Switzerland accessible by public transport

References

External links

 Official Home page
 Pictures Stanserhorn
 Stanserhorn-Bahn

Mountains of the Alps
Mountains of Nidwalden
Tourist attractions in Switzerland
Buildings and structures with revolving restaurants
Funicular railways in Switzerland
Cable cars in Switzerland
Tourist attractions in Nidwalden
One-thousanders of Switzerland
Mountains of Switzerland